Claude Francis Bice (September 4, 1879 – June 24, 1953) was an American football coach and college faculty member. He served as the head football coach at Fort Hays State University (then known as Western Branch of the Kansas State Normal School) from 1908 to 1909. He was a part-time gymnasium instructor at the school during the 1902–03 academic year.

References

External links
 

1879 births
1953 deaths
Fort Hays State University alumni
Fort Hays State Tigers football coaches
People from Marion, Iowa